The Auckland District Law Society is the professional body for barristers and solicitors practising in the Auckland region of New Zealand. It operates in conjunction with the New Zealand Law Society and was established in 1879. Membership was compulsory in accordance with the Law Practitioners Act 1982, until c.2008.

References

Further reading 
 Dugdale, D. F. 1979. Lawful occasions: notes on the history of the Auckland District Law Society, 1879-1979. [Auckland]: Auckland District Law Society.

Bar associations of Asia
1879 establishments in New Zealand
Law societies
Organisations based in Auckland